Podoscypha petalodes is a widely distributed species of fungus in the family Meruliaceae. The fungus produces a rosette-like fruit bodies with a shape suggestive of its common names wine glass fungus, and ruffled paper fungus.

References

Fungi described in 1852
Fungi of Australia
Fungi of New Zealand
Fungi of North America
Fungi of South America
Meruliaceae
Taxa named by Miles Joseph Berkeley